This indecisive battle took place on 4 October 1710, during the Great Northern War, in Køge Bay, just south of Copenhagen. Denmark had 26 ships of the line and 5 frigates with 1808 guns, and Sweden had 21 ships of the line and several frigates with 1512 guns. The Danish ship Dannebroge exploded and of the 550-man crew only 9 survived. The Swedish ships Tre Kronor and Prinsessan Ulrika Eleonora ran aground. Because of the weather the battle could not continue. However, the Swedish fleet managed to sink and capture a Danish convoy of transport ships that were supposed to embark a Russian invasion force in Danzig. The action in Køge Bugt checked those Russian invasion plans of Sweden.

Ships involved

Denmark (Gyldenløve)
Elephant 90 (flag)
Fredericus IV 110
Christianus V 100
Dannebroge 94 - Blew up
Justitia 90
Norske Løve 84
Mars 80
Tre Løver 78
Prinds Christian 76
Sophia Hedvig 76
Wenden 72
Dronning Louisa 70
Haffru 70
Beskjermer 64
Ebenetzer 64
Charlotte Amalia 60
Svan 60
Anna Sophia 60
Fredericus III 56
Oldenborg 52
Sværdfisk 52
Tomler 52
Nelleblad 52
Fyen 50
Delmenhorst 50
Island 50

Sweden (Wachtmeister)
Göta Lejon 90 (flag)
Enigheten 94
Tre Kronor 86 - Aground, scuttled next day
Wenden 82
Sverige 82
Prinsessan Hedvig 80
Prinsessan Ulrika 80 - Aground, scuttled next day
Gota 76
Nordstjernan 76
Prins Carl 76
Prins Carl Fredrik 72
Småland 70
Karlskrona 70
Skåne 68
Bremen 64
Fredrika Amalia 62
Westmanland 62
Pommern 56
Södermanland 56
Wachtmeister 56
Werden 54
Several fireships - Burnt? 2 days later

Sources 
 Lars Ericson Wolke (2011), Sjöslag och Rysshärjningar s. 130-133
Tor Jørgen Melien (2010), Iver Huitfeldt og slaget i Køge bugt 1710, Bergen: John Grieg AS: C. Huitfeldt forlag
 Gunnar Unger (1923). Illustrerad Svensk Sjökrigshistoria omfattande tiden intill 1680–1814. Stockholm: Albert Bonniers Förlag
 Lars Ericson Wolke, Martin Hårdstedt (2009), Svenska sjöslag
 R.C. Anderson (1910), Naval Wars in the Baltic during the Sailing Ship Epoch 1522–1850. London: C. Gilbert-Wood
For Kongen og Flåten. Matros Trosners dagbok 1710-1714 (1 ed.). Bergen: Fagbokforlaget. 2017. The diary is published by Hans Christian Bjerg and Tor Jørgen Melien.

Conflicts in 1710
Køge Bay
1710 in Denmark